Toshitaka is a masculine Japanese given name.

Possible writings
Toshitaka can be written using different combinations of kanji characters. Examples: 

敏隆, "agile, noble"
敏孝, "agile, filial piety"
敏貴, "agile, precious"
敏高, "agile, tall"
俊隆, "talented, noble"
俊孝, "talented, filial piety"
俊貴, "talented, precious"
寿隆, "long life, noble"
寿孝, "long life, filial piety"
寿貴, "long life, precious"
寿喬, "long life, high"
利隆, "benefit, noble"
利孝, "benefit, filial piety"
年隆, "year, noble"
年貴, "year, precious" 

The name can also be written in hiragana としたか or katakana トシタカ.

Notable people with the name
Toshitaka Ikeda (池田 利隆, 1584–1616), Japanese daimyō.
Toshitaka Kimura (木村 敏隆, born 1963), Japanese rugby union player.
Toshitaka Kajino (梶野 敏貴, born 1956), Japanese astronomer.
Toshitaka Maeda (前田 利孝, 1594–1637), Japanese daimyō.
Toshitaka Nanbu (南部 利敬, 1782–1820), Japanese daimyō.
Toshitaka Shimizu (清水 敏孝, 1968–2003), Japanese voice actor.
Toshitaka Tsurumi (鶴見 聡貴, born 1986), Japanese footballer.

Japanese masculine given names